Najran, is a city in southwestern Saudi Arabia near the border with Yemen. It is the capital of Najran Province. Designated as a new town, Najran is one of the fastest-growing cities in the kingdom; its population has risen from 47,500 in 1974 and 90,983 in 1992 to 246,880 in 2004 and 505,652 in 2017. The population mostly originates from the ancient tribes of Yām, Mákram, and Hamdan.

Najranis are Muslims, with Ismaili Shias forming a plurality. Hanbali, Shafi'i, and Maliki Sunnis form the second-largest religious group in the city, while the Zaydi Shia form the smallest religious group.

The Arabic term  has at least two meanings: both the wooden frame on which a door opens and also 'thirsty'. Local tradition also has it that the land derived its name from the first man to settle in the area, Najran ibn Zaydan ibn Saba ibn Yahjub ibn Yarub ibn Qahtan.

Najran was a Yemeni centre of cloth making and originally, the kiswah or the cloth of the Ka'aba was made there (the clothing of the Kaba first started by the Yemeni kings of Saba).  There used to be a Jewish community at Najran, renowned for the garments they manufactured.  According to Yemenite Jewish tradition, the Jews of Najran traced their origin to the Ten Tribes.  Najran was also an important stopping place on the Incense Route.

History

Early history

The history of Najrān can be traced back to 4,000 years ago. It was once occupied by the Romans; in fact, it was the first Yemeni city to fall to the Romans on their way to the Yemeni kingdom of Saba'. Najrān's most prosperous trading time was during the 1st and 2nd centuries BC. In ancient times it was known as Al-Ukhdūd.

Similar to other ancient place names in Arabia, Najrān may have originally been the name of the whole oasis including all towns and villages. The old name of the ruins now known as "al-Ukhdūd", which may have been the central town, probably corresponds to Ramat.

According to Greek and Roman sources, Najrān was a focal point of the Incense Route. All routes that left ancient Yemen to the north or west had to meet at Najrān, where the routes branched into two general directions, the ones leading north through the Ḥijāz towards Egypt and the Levant and those leading to the northeast towards Gerrha near the Persian Gulf.

Najrān was conquered around 685 BC by the Sabean Mukarrib (King) Karib'il Watar I King of Yemen. The later Sabean king Yithi'amar Bayin destroyed RagHmat around 510 BC. Najrān seems to have been under Minaean or Sabean rule at different times during the next centuries and after that, it was part of Yemen till 1937.

The Roman prefect of Egypt Aelius Gallus led a costly, arduous and ultimately unsuccessful expedition to conquer Arabia Felix and won a battle near Najrān in 25 BC. He occupied the city and used it as a base from which to attack the Sabaean capital at Ma'rib. According to Strabo, who called it 'Negrana', Najrān was at this time the northernmost city of the realm of Saba'.

When the Ḥimyarites conquered the Sabeans in AD 280 they probably also took control of Najrān. Sometime during the 3rd century, the people of Najrān sided with the Abyssinians who sent a governor named Sqlmqlm" in inscriptions. The Ḥimyar King Ilsharah Yahdib crushed this rebellion.

The north Arabian Lakhmid king Imru’ al-Qays ibn 'Amqu attacked Najrān in AD 328. Under the influence of Axum, the Christians in Najrān thrived and started an alliance with Aksum again at the beginning of the 6th century.

The town of Najrān was already an important centre of arms manufacture during the lifetime of Muhammad. However, it was more famous for leather rather than iron.

Early Christian community

Christianity must have been introduced into Najrān, as in the rest of South Arabia, in the 5th century AD or perhaps a century earlier. According to the Arab Muslim historian Ibn Isḥāq, Najran was the first place where Christianity took root in South Arabia.
According to the contemporary sources, after seizing the throne of the Ḥimyarites, in ca. 518 or 523, Dhū Nuwās, a Jewish king, attacked the Aksumite (mainly Christian) garrison at Zafar, capturing it and burning its churches. He then moved against Najrān, a Christian and Aksumite stronghold. After accepting the city's capitulation, he massacred those inhabitants who would not renounce Christianity. Estimates of the death toll from this event range up to 20,000 in some sources; a surviving letter (where he is called Dimnon) written by Simon, the bishop of Beth Arsham in 524 AD, recounts Dhū Nuwās's persecution in Najrān (modern al-Ukhdūd in Saudi Arabia).

Under the reign of the Caliph ‘Umar, the Christian community of Najrān was deported to Mesopotamia, on the grounds that Muhammad ordered all non-Muslims to be expelled from the Arabian Peninsula.

Former Jewish community

Najrān had a Jewish community dating back to pre-Islamic times, historically affiliated with the Bnei Chorath who were Yemenite Jews that had conquered the city and ruled until the Christian invasion of Yemen. With the Saudi conquest of Najrān in 1934, persecution increased, and some 200 Jews of Najrān fled south to Aden between September and October 1949. The Saudi King ʻAbd al-ʻAziz demanded their return, but the Yemeni king Aḥmad bin Yaḥyá refused because these refugees were Yemenite Jews. After settling in the Ḥashid Camp (also called Mahane Geula) they were airlifted to Israel as part of the larger Operation Magic Carpet.

Some groups of Najran Jews escaped to Cochin, as they had a very good relationship with the rulers of Cochin and maintained trade connections with Paradesi Jews.

Najran as part of Saudi Arabia

Najrān joined the newly announced Kingdom of Saudi Arabia in 1934 as a result of the efforts and struggles of Shaikh Jābir Abū Sāq, the leader of a large clan of the Yam tribe. Starting in 1924, the forces of the former Yemeni king launched several unsuccessful raids to annex Najrān to the Yemeni Kingdom. The king of Yemen performed some new maneuvers to strengthen his tie with some of the Najrān tribal leaders to counter the strong relations of the people of Najrān with Bin Saūd. Then in 1932, the forces of King Yahya of Yemen attacked Najrān with more than 50,000 troops, with many kinds of new weapons. Yām, as the dominant tribe in Najrān, along with some other loyalist Najranis, started strong resistance against the occupation forces. However, a strong segment of the tribal leaders in Najrān sided with the Yemenis and some became passive, waiting to take a side at the end of the crisis. Sheikh Jābir Abū Sāq, the head of Al Fatema clan of Yām at the time, managed to get quick support from King Abd al-Azīz Bin Saūd and was able to lead the Yām tribe and all of the Najrānī resistance fighting the Yemeni forces in all parts of Najrān and Bilād Yām. Later, in the spring of 1934, the army of Bin Saʻud under the command of Prince Saʻūd son of ʻAbd al-ʻAzīz carried out a massive campaign, surrounding Najrān from the north and northwest, and defeated the Yemeni army. Najrān became part of Saudi Arabia. In short, Najran has always been independent and ruled by its people (Yam) but they choose to be annexed to the New Kingdom. Indeed, there was a strong treaty between King ʻAbd al-ʻAzīz and the people from Najrān indicating conditions to be respected by both sides.

Issues with the Ismaili community
The Ismailis, a religious and ethnic minority with historic roots in Najrān Province of southwestern Saudi Arabia, face increasing threats to their identity as a result of official discrimination. With the arrival of Mishʻal bin Suʻūd as the governor of Najrān in 1996, tensions between local authorities and the Ismaili population increased, culminating in a confrontation between armed Ismāʻīlī demonstrators and police and army units outside the Holiday Inn hotel in Najrān city in April 2000. Official discrimination in Saudi Arabia against Ismāʻīlīs encompasses government employment, religious practices, and the justice system. Government officials exclude Ismāʻīlīs from decision making and publicly disparage their faith.

The confrontation at the Holiday Inn in Najrān city on April 23, 2000, marked a watershed in Ismāʻīlī relations with the central government. Three months earlier, police had closed all Ismāʻīlī mosques on a religious holiday. On April 23, after security forces and religious morality police arrested an Ismāʻīlī cleric, a large demonstration took place outside the Holiday Inn, where governor Mishʻal resided. After the governor refused for hours to meet the petitioners, an exchange of fire between security forces and armed demonstrators left two Ismāʻīlīs dead and, according to some government accounts, killed one policeman as well. Believing their religious identity to be under attack, Ismāʻili men erected defences around Khushaywah, the seat of the Ismāʻīlī religious leader, al-Dāʼiʻ al-Muṭlaq (Absolute Guide), and the spiritual capital of Sulaymānī Ismāʻīlīs, a community with followers in India and Pakistan as well as Saudi Arabia and Yemen. Khushaywah, which is an area of Najrān city, includes the Manṣūrah Mosque complex. The army surrounded the Ismāʻīlī positions and placed the city under its control. The standoff ended later the same day without further bloodshed.

Archaeology

Najrān city is famous for its archeological significance. Old Najrān was surrounded by a circular wall, 220 by 230 meters, built of square stone with defensive balconies. It contained several unique buildings. There is also a cemetery south of the external wall. Excavations of this site have uncovered glass, metals, pottery, and bronze artifacts. Square and rectangular buildings have also been found. At Al-Ukhdūd which is south of Najrān city, carvings from those days and human bones can be seen. A museum displays, among other items, a bronze lion head. Najrān's landmarks include the "Rass" stone, a 2-meter-high granite stone.

Geography

Topography
Najran enjoys three different geographic landscapes: oases, mountains, and the desert on its eastern side.

Climate
Najran has a hot desert climate (Köppen BWh), typical of the Arabian Peninsula. The rainfall is very sporadic in occurrence and consists of light individual rainfall. Despite its location in far southern Saudi Arabia, Najran's average temperature is approximately  cooler than that of the Saudi capital Riyadh, due to it being  higher in altitude.

Education

Colleges and universities
Najran is home to Najran University and Najran College of Technology.

Sports

Local football clubs
 Al-Okdod Club (Arabic: نادي الأخدود) founded in 1976
 Sharora Club  (Arabic: نادي شرورة) founded in 1975
 Najran SC   (Arabic: نادي نجران) founded in 1980

Sports centers
There are many sports centers and complexes within the city including:
 Khldiat Al-Janob Sport Center (Arabic: مركز الخالدية الرياضي )
 Prince Mishal Sport Center (Arabic:  مركز الأمير مشعل )
 Najran Bowling Alley

Hospitals and medical care
 King Khalid Hospital
 Najran General Hospital
 Maternity & Children's Hospital Najran
 Najran Armed Forces Hospital
 General Psychiatric Hospital
 Al Zafer Hospital
 Al Hayah Hospital
 Al Qadi Specialty Hospital
 Al Shefa Medical Hospital
International Medical Complex
 Al Masa dental center

Hotels
 Park Inn by Radisson Najran
 Happy Day Inn
 Hyatt Najran
 Holiday Inn
 Al-Okhdood
 Najran Crown
 Najran Hotel
 Ramada Hotel
 Snob hotel
 Gloria Inn

See also 

 List of cities and towns in Saudi Arabia

Further reading

 Irfan Shahîd, The Martyrs of Najrân. New Documents, Brussels (1971).
 Irfan Shahîd, Byzantium and the Arabs in the Fifth Century, Dumbarton Oaks (1989), .
 Hugh Goddard, A History of Christian-Muslim Relations, Edinburgh University Press (2000), .
 Josef W. Meri, Jere L. Bacharach, Medieval Islamic Civilization, Taylor & Francis (2006), .
 Mark A. Caudill, Twilight in the Kingdom, Greenwood Publishing Group (2006), .
 Andre Vauchez, Richard Barrie Dobson, Michael Lapidge, Adrian Walford, Encyclopedia of the Middle Ages, Routledge (2001), .
 Joel Thomas Walker, The Legend of Mar Qardagh, University of California Press (2006), .

References

 This text is adapted from William Muir's public domain, The Caliphate: Its Rise, Decline, and Fall.

External links
Travel through the province of Najran, Splendid Arabia: A travel site with photos and routes

 
Populated places in Najran Province
History of Christianity in Yemen
Shia communities
Saudi Arabia–Yemen border crossings
Provincial capitals of Saudi Arabia